Killed by Death may refer to:
 "Killed by Death" (song), a 1984 single by Motörhead
 "Killed by Death" (Buffy the Vampire Slayer), episode 18 of the second season of Buffy the Vampire Slayer
 Killed by Death (albums), an album series compiling rare early punk music from the late 70s and early 80s